Jackson Township is one of the sixteen townships of Crawford County, Ohio, United States. As of the 2010 census the population of the township was 381, down from 5,487 people reported in 2000, when the village of Crestline's population was included.

Geography
Located in the southeastern part of the county, it borders the following townships:
Vernon Township - north
Sharon Township, Richland County - northeast
Sandusky Township, Richland County - southeast
Polk Township - south
Jefferson Township - west

Most of the village of Crestline is located in central Jackson Township.

Name and history
Jackson Township was created in 1835. It was named for Andrew Jackson.

It is one of thirty-seven Jackson Townships statewide.

Government
The township is governed by a three-member board of trustees, who are elected in November of odd-numbered years to a four-year term beginning on the following January 1. Two are elected in the year after the presidential election and one is elected in the year before it. There is also an elected township fiscal officer, who serves a four-year term beginning on April 1 of the year after the election, which is held in November of the year before the presidential election. Vacancies in the fiscal officership or on the board of trustees are filled by the remaining trustees.

References

External links
County website

Townships in Crawford County, Ohio
Townships in Ohio